The electronics industry in the Socialist Republic of Romania was characterized by stronger ties to Western Europe when compared to other countries in the Eastern Bloc due to the drive of the Romanian leadership towards greater autonomy from the Soviet Union.

History 

In 1960 the government of Gheorghe Gheorghiu-Dej decided to build an electronics plant in the forest of Băneasa which in 1962 was named Baneasa Radio and Semiconductor Parts Company ( or I.P.R.S.). The production of integrated circuits started in 1970 with technology from Thomson-CSF. The plant developed steadily and grew to 6,000 employees by the early 1980s. By 1990 the product range included bipolar digital and linear integrated circuits (including 7400 series integrated circuits), silicon transistors and diodes, microwave devices, thyristors, triacs, and capacitors. I.P.R.S. manufactured with the designation βP14500 a clone of the 1-bit-microprocessor Motorola MC14500B in I2L technology.

In 1969 the Research Center for the Design of Electronic Components ( or CCPCE) was established on the grounds of I.P.R.S. but independent from it. The research center developed semiconductor products from initial experiments to pilot production, at which point the mass manufacturing was handed over to I.P.R.S. By 1974 the center moved to a new headquarter adjacent to I.P.R.S. and changed its name to Research Institute for Electronic Components ( or ICCE). With new production facilities opened in 1979 the institute started to manufacture transistors, diodes, integrated circuits, optoelectronics, and microwave devices for end customers, in particular products that were needed only in small quantities (a few thousand per month) and could therefore not be manufactured economically at I.P.R.S.

A third entity, Microelectronica was set up in 1981 close to I.P.R.S. and ICCE with the goal of manufacturing PMOS, NMOS, and CMOS integrated circuits (including 4000-series integrated circuits) as well as optoelectronics, complementing the production profile of I.P.R.S. Microelectronica manufactured a clone of the Intel 8080 with the designation MMN8080 and a clone of the Zilog Z80 with the designation MMN80CPU. The MMN80CPU entered production in 1988. For comparison, the original Z80 was launched in 1976 and the East German clone U880 in 1980.

After 1990 
I.P.R.S. remained in government hands until 2003. After a factory upgrade in 1992 a steady decline set in. The number of employees dropped to 5000 in 1991 and 2000 at the end of the 1990s. Amid allegations of corruption the plant was sold in 2003 to Syrian businessman Omar Hayssam (who was in 2013 sentenced to a 20-year prison term for organizing the kidnapping of three Romanian journalists in Baghdad). By 2008, I.P.R.S. was declared bankrupt. The equipment had been stolen or sold for scrap at that point.

ICCE was first split into four sections but largely re-united in 1996 as the Institute for Microtechnology ( or IMT). While IMT still exists in 2020, it has lost its own commercial manufacturing capabilities as well as its industry partners I.P.R.S. and Microelectronica.

Microelectronica ceased commercial operation in 1997 and many of its specialists transferred to IMT. As of 2020, Microelectronica still exists as a "technology showcase", albeit without any products and few employees.

Semiconductor designation 
Unlike the Soviet integrated circuit designation or the East German semiconductor designation, the Romanian government did not set standards for the labelling of semiconductors. Devices licensed from Western manufacturers were often named according to the Pro Electron standard. Microelectronica assigned integrated circuit designations according to the underlying technology: MMP for PMOS (e.g. MMP106), MMN for NMOS (e.g. MMN8080), and MMC for CMOS (e.g. MMC4001).

See also 
 History of computing in Romania

References

External links 
 
 
 

Electronics industry by country
Economic history of Romania
Socialist Republic of Romania
Science and technology in Romania